Gerald Hill (15 April 1913 – 31 January 2006) was an English first-class cricketer who played for Hampshire from 1932 to 1954. A right-handed batsman and right-arm off break bowler, Hill played 371 first-class games for Hampshire. Hill was spotted by the cricketer and writer Sir Arthur Conan Doyle. Doyle was playing golf with Hill's father when he spotted the young Hill playing on an adjoining pitch. Doyle then wrote to Colonel J. G. Greig, Hampshire's secretary, to arrange a trial.

In 1935, Hill was hit for 32 in an over by Glamorgan's Cyril Smart (6, 6, 4, 6, 6, 4), then the most expensive six-ball over in first-class history. In 1937, during a County Championship match played against Sussex at the United Services Recreation Ground, Hill and Donald Walker put on 235 for the 5th wicket, which remains to this day a Hampshire record.

Kent captain Percy Chapman, a family friend of Hill's, presented him with his County Cap in 1935. Hill was accidentally shot in the leg by teammate Len Creese, while bowling in the nets. The bullet stayed in Hill's leg for the remainder of his life. Hill fought in the Second World War in Italy and resumed his first-class career with Hampshire after the resumption of the County Championship in 1946. Hill retired from first-class cricket in 1954. Hill batted in all 11 positions for Hampshire scoring four centuries, including a highest score of 161 against Sussex at Portsmouth.

Hill died in his sleep at his home at Lyndhurst in the New Forest on 31 January 2006.

References

External links
Gerry Hill on Cricinfo
Gerry Hill on CricketArchive

1913 births
2006 deaths
People from Totton and Eling
English cricketers
Hampshire cricketers
British Army personnel of World War II
British Army soldiers